The Chrysler A engine is a small-block V8 gasoline engine built by Chrysler with polyspherical combustion chambers. It was produced from 1956 until 1967, when it was replaced by the wedge-head LA engine, although the LA was in production alongside the A from 1964 - 1967. It is not related to the hemispherical-head Hemi engine of the 1950s.

The A engine was first released in 1956 and was used exclusively in Plymouths until 1958 and in Chryslers and Dodges from 1959 on. The Desoto and Dodge 270/315/325 poly was not related to the Plymouth Polys, using the same bottom end as the Dodge and Desoto Red Ram Hemi, but utilizing similar head architecture. The A engine formed the design basis of its successor, the LA engine, evidenced in the many parts that interchange between the two engine families.

Plymouth

277

The 277 "Hy-Fire" was the first A-block engine, produced for 1955 in the fall of 1954 and sharing almost nothing but the basic concepts with other engines built by Chrysler. It was replaced by the 301 in 1957, except for in low-priced Plaza models where it continued to be used during the 1957 model year. The Power Pack was also fitted to the Facel Vega FV3, of which 48 examples were built in 1956 and 1957.

301

The Plymouth 301 replaced the 277 in 1957 and kept that engine's  stroke. These dimensions are entirely different from the 1955 Chrysler 301. This engine was also installed in the 1957–1958 Facel Vega FV3B.

303

This engine was used in the following vehicles:
 1956 Dodge Custom Royal (Canadian)
 1956 Chrysler Windsor (Canadian)
 1956 Plymouth Fury,  with 4-barrel carburetor
 1957 standard on all -wheelbase Dodges and Plymouths

313
A  version of the A engine called the 313 was produced from 1957 to 1967 primarily for Canadian and export markets.
 1957 Canadian Dodge Custom Royal
 1957–1964 Australian Chrysler Royal
 1958–1967 standard or available in all Canadian-market Dodges and Plymouths except Valiants, Barracudas, and Darts.
 1961–1963 Bristol 407
 1963–1965 Bristol 408 Mark I

318
The 318 is the most common version of the A engine, produced from 1957 through 1966 in the US and 1967 in some export markets when it was replaced in all markets by the LA 318. Only Plymouth used this 318 in 1957 and 1958, but it was shared with Chrysler from 1959 on and Dodge from 1960 on. It displaces  and has a  bore and the  stroke.

A high-performance version called the V-800, offered in 1957 and 1958, used two four-barrel Carter carburetors to produce , making it the highest-output factory A engine. It was used in the 1957 and 1958 Plymouth Fury, but was also an option on Plymouth models lower in the model range.

Bristol Cars introduced the 318 in the Mark II model of their 408 (in 1965) and continued to use it in the succeeding 409 and 410 until 1969. From 1962 until early 1965, Checker used this engine for their Aerobus limousines.

Non-Plymouth

326

The 326 was launched in 1959 Dodges. Its actual piston displacement is  but it was marketed as a 326 to avoid confusion with the Dodge Red Ram 325. It uses hydraulic tappets, unlike the other A engines that used solid, and was used in the 1959 Dodge Coronet.

References

External links

A engine link on Allpar

A
V8 engines
Gasoline engines by model